Alexander Löhr (20 May 1885 – 26 February 1947) was an Austrian Air Force commander during the 1930s and, after the annexation of Austria, he was a Luftwaffe commander. Löhr served in the Luftwaffe during World War II, rising to commander of Army Group E and then to commander-in-chief in Southeastern Europe (OB Südost). 

Löhr was captured by Yugoslav Partisans at the end of the war in Europe. He was tried and convicted of war crimes by the Yugoslav government for anti-partisan reprisals committed under his command, and the bombing of Belgrade in 1941. He was executed by firing squad on 26 February 1947 In Belgrade, Yugoslavia.

Early life and career
Löhr was born on 20 May 1885 in Turnu-Severin in the Kingdom of Romania. He was the youngest child of Friedrich Johann Löhr and his wife Catherine, née Heimann. His father had served as a 2nd captain on a hospital ship in the Black Sea during the Russo-Turkish War. Here his father had met his mother, a Ukrainian nurse. She was the daughter of the  military doctor Mihail Alexandrovich Heimann from Odessa. After the war, they married in 1879 and moved to Turnu-Severin in Romania. The marriage produced three sons. Due to his mother's faith, he belonged to the Eastern Orthodox Church; he grew up speaking German, Russian, French and Romanian. Löhr attended a military secondary school in Kaschau, present-day Košice in Slovakia until 1900.

Löhr transferred to the infantry cadet school at Temeswar, present-day Timișoara in Romania, in January 1900. In 1903 he was posted to Vienna, where he attended the Theresian Military Academy in Burg Wiener Neustadt until 1906. He graduated from the military academy on 18 August 1906, with an overall rating of "very good". On the same day Löhr was retired as a second lieutenant and immediately volunteered for active service. Löhr served as platoon commander of a pioneer battalion in the Imperial and Royal 85th Infantry Regiment of the Austro-Hungarian Army in World War I. By 1921 Löhr had reached the rank of Lieutenant-Colonel. Between 1921 and 1934 he held many staff positions in the military, including Director of the Air Force in the Federal Armies Ministry. In 1934, he was made Commander of the small Austrian Air Force, a position which he held until the annexation in 1938.

World War II

Löhr, who had been promoted to Major on 1 July 1920, was accepted into the newly created Austrian Armed Forces on 1 September 1920. On 15 March 1938, Löhr was transferred to the Luftwaffe, where he became commander of Luftwaffe forces in Austria. By then he had been promoted to Generalleutnant. He was commander of Luftflotte 4 in the East from May 1939 until June 1942.

Luftflotte 4 carried out the bombing of Warsaw, Poland in September 1939 and of Belgrade, Yugoslavia in April 1941. Löhr had developed a plan to bomb Belgrade with incendiary bombs first, so that the fires would help the second, nighttime, attack to find the targets. This cost thousands of people their lives. Löhr was promoted to colonel general effective 3 May 1941. He commanded the 12th Army from 12 July 1942 through to December 1942.

Commander-in-Chief South East 
Löhr succeeded General der Pioniere Walter Kuntze as Commander-in-Chief of the 12th Army on 3 July 1942. He was appointed the Wehrmacht Commander in southeast Europe on 1 August 1942, and from 28 December 1942 this position was re-designated as Commander-in-chief in southeast Europe. The forces under his command were also designated as Army Group E, and he was appointed as its commander. In this role, Löhr controlled all subordinate commands in southeast Europe, including the commanding general in Serbia (Paul Bader), the military commander in the Salonika-Aegean area (Curt von Krenzki), the military commander in southern Greece, the commander of Crete, the naval commander in the Aegean Sea, the German plenipotentiary general in the Independent State of Croatia, the commanding general of German troops in Croatia, and the military attaché in Sofia, Bulgaria. Löhr organised the fourth and fifth offensives against Yugoslav Partisans in 1943, during which most of those taken prisoner, including the wounded, were murdered on the spot. As Commander-in-Chief of Army Group E, Löhr oversaw the Dodecanese campaign.  On 26 August 1944, with the Allies driving on Germany on three fronts, Hitler ordered Löhr to begin evacuating Army Group E from Greece and move north to defend the Fatherland.

At the end of the war in Europe, Löhr received orders for unconditional surrender, but instead directed his forces to break out towards Austria. According to the historian Jozo Tomasevich, Löhr was captured by the 14th Slovene Division in Slovenia on 9 May 1945, and attempted to negotiate passage for his troops to Austria. This was refused and Löhr was prevailed upon to issue orders to cease fighting, which the troops nonetheless disobeyed. He escaped, countermanded his order to surrender and continued with the breakout attempt. After an intense manhunt, Löhr was recaptured on 13 May.

Conviction and execution
Löhr was imprisoned by Yugoslavia from 15 May 1945 to 26 February 1947. He was tried and convicted for war crimes committed during the anti-partisan operations of 1943, including the killing of hostages and burning of villages, and disregarding Germany's unconditional surrender. On 16 February 1947, the court sentenced the accused based on Article 3, Item 3 of the Act on Crimes Against the Nation and the State, Löhr to death by firing squad, and co-defendants Generalleutnants Josef Kübler and Hans Fortner, Generalmajor Adalbert Lontschar, Oberst Gunther Tribukait and SS-Brigadeführer August Schmidthuber to death by hanging.

References

Citations

Bibliography

Further reading

External links 

 

1885 births
1947 deaths
People from Drobeta-Turnu Severin
Eastern Orthodox Christians from Austria
Austrian people of German descent
Austrian people of Russian descent
Austrian people of Ukrainian-Jewish descent
Austrian military personnel of World War II
Austro-Hungarian military personnel of World War I
Austrian mass murderers
Luftwaffe World War II generals
Recipients of the Order of Franz Joseph
Recipients of the Knight's Cross of the Iron Cross with Oak Leaves
Austrian people executed abroad
Executed military leaders
Executed Austrian Nazis
People executed by Yugoslavia by firing squad
Austro-Hungarian Army officers
Colonel generals of the Luftwaffe
Luftwaffe personnel convicted of war crimes
Theresian Military Academy alumni
Executed mass murderers